League tables for teams participating in Ykkönen, the second tier of the Finnish football league system, in 2006.

League table

League Movements
Two teams were directly promoted to the Veikkausliiga (and only two teams were relegated to the Kakkonen) because Allianssi Vantaa withdrew from the Veikkausliiga and they were not replaced by another club.

References

Ykkönen seasons
2006 in Finnish football
Fin
Fin